Ernest Egdell (29 May 1922 – 27 February 1976) was an English amateur footballer who played in the Football League for Darlington and in non-league football for Consett. He appeared only once for Darlington in competitive matches, on 16 September 1946, standing in for Tom Kelly at right back in a 4–1 Third Division North defeat away to local rivals Hartlepools United. The West Hartlepool-based Northern Daily Mail match report refers to him as "Edgehill".

Egdell was born in Newcastle upon Tyne in 1922, and died in Salford, Greater Manchester, in 1976 at the age of 53.

References

1922 births
1976 deaths
Footballers from Newcastle upon Tyne
English footballers
Association football defenders
Consett A.F.C. players
Darlington F.C. players
English Football League players